Corten is a village in Taraclia District, Moldova.

References

Villages of Taraclia District
Bulgarian communities in Moldova